Alena Mazouka (also  - Yelena Mazovka; born June 30, 1967) is a retired female long-distance runner from Belarus, who represented her native country at the 1996 Summer Olympics in the women's marathon race. There she finished in 24th place in the overall-rankings. Mazovka set her personal best (2:29:06) in the classic distance in 1997.

Achievements

References
 
 

1967 births
Living people
Belarusian female long-distance runners
Olympic athletes of Belarus
Athletes (track and field) at the 1996 Summer Olympics
Belarusian female marathon runners